Beesalpur is a village in Todaraisingh tehsil, Tonk district, Rajasthan, India, located at 31 km from main Deoli city. The population was 4,106 at the 2011 Indian census.

Geography

Nearest districts
Beesalpur is located around 16.0 kilometer away from its district headquarters Agra. The other nearest district headquarters is Khalilabad situated at 35.9 km distance from Beesalpur. Surrounding districts from Beesalpur are as follows.
Firozabad district	33.6 km.
Mathura district	        57.2 km.
Morena district	        59.0 km.
Etah district                        61.4 km

Nearest town/city
Beesalpur‘s nearest town/city/important place is Kheragarh located at the distance of 12.8 kilometer. Surrounding town/city/TP/CT from Beesalpur are as follows.
Kheragarh	12.8 km.
Dhanauli	12.8 km.
Kiraoli	        16.4 km.
Agra	        19.9 km.
Achhnera	21.7 km.

Transport

By rail
The nearest railway station to Beesalpur is Bichpuri which is located in and around 15.8 kilometer distance. The following table shows other railway stations and its distance from Mamakudi.
Bichpuri railway station 	             15.8 km.
Idgah Agra Jn railway station .   16.0 km.
Kiraoli railway station	             16.2 km.
Raja Ki Mandi railway station.   19.8 km.
Agra Fort railway station	     19.9 km.

By air
Beesalpur‘s nearest airport is Agra Air Force Station situated at 14.8 km distance. Few more airports around Beesalpur are as follows.
Agra Air Force Station 14.8 km.
Gwalior Airport	     -        88.0 km.
Aligarh Airport	     -        94.9 km.

Education
There are two  primary government  schools and one junior highschool and one private ITI and Senior Secondary school in the village.

References

Villages in Tonk district